Alpha-ketoglutarate dehydrogenase also known as 2-oxoglutarate dehydrogenase E1 component, mitochondrial is an enzyme that in humans is encoded by the OGDH gene.

Structure

Gene 

The OGDH gene is located on the 7th chromosome, with the specific location being 7p14-p13. There are 26 exons located within the gene.

Protein 

This gene encodes a subunit that catalyzes the oxidative decarboxylation of alpha-ketoglutarate to Succinyl-CoA at its active site in the fourth step of the citric acid cycle by acting as a base to facilitate the decarboxylation. The main residues responsible for the catalysis are thought to be His 260, Phe 227, Gln685, His 729, Ser302, and His 298.

Function 

This gene encodes one subunit of the 2-oxoglutarate dehydrogenase complex. This complex catalyzes the overall conversion of 2-oxoglutarate (alpha-ketoglutarate) to succinyl-CoA and CO2 during the citric acid cycle. The protein is located in the mitochondrial matrix and uses thiamine pyrophosphate as a cofactor. The overall complex furthers catalysis by keeping the necessary substrates for the reaction close within the enzyme, thus creating a situation in which it is more likely that the substrate will be in the favorable conformation and orientation. This enzyme is also part of a larger multienzyme complex that channels the intermediates in the catalysis between subunits of the complex thus minimizing unwanted side reactions. Not only do the subunits ferry products back and forth, but each of the subunits in the E1o homodimer are connected via a cavity lined with acidic residues, thus increasing the dimer's ability to act as a base. The orientation of the cavity allows for direct transfer of the intermediate to the E2o subunit.

Mechanism 

The protein encoded by OGDH is thought to have a single active site. The enzyme also requires two cofactors in order for it to function properly, Thiamine diphosphate and  a divalent magnesium ion. The specific mechanism of the subunit is currently unknown; however, there are several theories as to how it functions, among them is the Hexa Uni Ping Pong theory. Even though the mechanism isn't fully known the kinetic data have been calculated and are as follows: the Km is 0.14 ± 0.04 mM, and the Vmax is 9 ± 3 μmol/(min*mg).

Regulation 

This subunit, known as E1o, catalyzes a rate-limiting step in the citric acid cycle and lies far from equilibrium; the total change in Gibbs free energy is ΔG = −33 kJ/mol. The significant energy change makes it a crucial point of regulation not only for the citric acid cycle, but also for the entire cellular respiration pathway. As such, E1o is inhibited by both NADH and Succinyl-CoA via non competitive feedback inhibition.

Clinical significance 

A congenital deficiency in 2-oxoglutarate dehydrogenase activity is believed to lead to hypotonia, metabolic acidosis, and hyperlactatemia. It is characterized by the buildup of a chemical called lactic acid in the body and a variety of neurological problems. Signs and symptoms of this condition usually first appear shortly after birth, and they can vary widely among affected individuals. The most common feature is a potentially life-threatening buildup of lactic acid (lactic acidosis), which can cause nausea, vomiting, severe breathing problems, and an abnormal heartbeat. People with pyruvate dehydrogenase deficiency usually have neurological problems as well. Most have delayed development of mental abilities and motor skills such as sitting and walking. Other neurological problems can include intellectual disability, seizures, weak muscle tone (hypotonia), poor coordination, and difficulty walking. Some affected individuals have abnormal brain structures, such as underdevelopment of the tissue connecting the left and right halves of the brain (corpus callosum), wasting away (atrophy) of the exterior part of the brain known as the cerebral cortex, or patches of damaged tissue (lesions) on some parts of the brain. Because of the severe health effects, many individuals with pyruvate dehydrogenase deficiency do not survive past childhood, although some may live into adolescence or adulthood.

Interactive pathway map

References

Further reading 

 
 
 
 
 
 
 
 
 
 

Mitochondrial proteins